Doris "Anita" Neil  (born 5 April 1950) is a retired British international sprinter. In 1968, she became the first black British woman Olympian. Her family were poor and she had to rely on charity to travel and obtain equipment. When she was 23 she had to retire to lack of money and facilities and she hid her trophies. When the Olympic torch passed through her area she was the only Olympic athlete and she was not asked to carry it. Only later was recognised for her contribution.

Early life 
Anita Neil was born in Wellingborough, Northamptonshire. Her father was an African American staff sergeant stationed in Wellingborough during World War II, where he met her mother, Florence, who was local to the town. Her father travelled between the USA and Britain and when she was six her father left them. Her mother and her children had endured discrimination and her mother relied on Anita's grandparents for support.

Career 
Neil  worked as a machinist in a clothing factory and trained in her spare time. Known primarily as a sprinter, Neil's first competition for Great Britain was in the long jump in 1966. She competed for GB in the 1967 European Cup. Neil was British champion in 100 metres in 1970 and 1971.

At a national competition in Portsmouth, she won the 100 yards and broke the national record (10.6 seconds). At the same meet she was part of the 4 x 110m relay team who set a World Record. Neil was invited to Buckingham Palace which she remembered because she met George Best.

She was encourage by her hero Mary Rand and she became a member of the women's athletics club London Olympiades. She is considered 'a pioneer in the first generation of Black British female Olympic Athletes'.:319

Olympics 
She competed in the 100 metres and the 4 x 100-metres relay at the 1968 Summer Olympics in Mexico. She progressed to the second round in the 100 metres and to the final in the relay.

She also competed at the 1972 Summer Olympics in Munich. Again she progressed to the second round in the 100 metres and to the final in the relay.

European Championships 
In 1969, she competed at the European Athletics Championships in Athens, where she won bronze medals in the 100 metres and 200 metres, as well as in 4 x 100-metres relay.:205

Commonwealth Games 
Neil represented England at the 1970 British Commonwealth Games in Edinburgh and won a silver medal in the 4 x 100 metres relay.

Later life 
When she was 23 she had to retire to lack of money and facilities and she hid her trophies. When the Olympic torch passed through her home town of Wellingborough she was the only Olympic athlete and she wasn't asked to carry it. Only later was she recognised for her contribution.

Neil continues to live in and has participated in local events. In 2012, she was a guest of honour at the opening of the Wellingborough Museum's exhibition on the Olympic Games. A portrait of her hangs in the museum. She also served as guest of honour at the official opening of the Knights Court in Wellingborough in 2014.

References

External links

1950 births
Living people
Athletes (track and field) at the 1968 Summer Olympics
Athletes (track and field) at the 1970 British Commonwealth Games
Athletes (track and field) at the 1972 Summer Olympics
Black British sportswomen
British female sprinters
Commonwealth Games medallists in athletics
Commonwealth Games silver medallists for England
European Athletics Championships medalists
Olympic athletes of Great Britain
People from Wellingborough
Olympic female sprinters
Medallists at the 1970 British Commonwealth Games